Uhorské is a village and municipality in the Poltár District in the Banská Bystrica Region of Slovakia.  In the village, there is a football pitch, a grocery store, a post office, a library, a kindergarten and an elementary school.  The village has retained its agricultural characteristics. The most significant sight is an evangelical church from 1700, which stands under state cultural protection.

References

External links
 
 

Villages and municipalities in Poltár District